Chalky Teeth is a colloquialism used to describe teeth that are abnormal in some way. The term usually refers to tooth enamel that is visibly different in colour, consistency or shape (morphology). Hence, by analogy to blackboard chalk, "chalky enamel" is discoloured, opaque, soft, porous and prone to degradation or staining – unlike normal enamel which is translucent, hard and impermeable. Chalky teeth and derivative terms ("chalky molars", "chalky enamel") have received widespread exposure as a metaphor for malformed teeth with elevated risk of tooth decay. A public "Chalky Teeth Campaign" highlights the major socioeconomic burdens of this medico-dental problem and desirability of research into prevention.  The gritty sensation elicited by oxalate-rich foods such as spinach may also be described as "chalky teeth'.

Dental anomalies described as chalky teeth

Since 1920, various derivatives of "chalky teeth" have appeared in the academic literature to describe specific dental anomalies.  Most references are to enamel defects that have a chalky appearance (white, cream or brown) and are of developmental origin (i.e. amelogenesis imperfecta, enamel hypomineralisation, dental fluorosis, molar hypomineralisation). Additionally, researchers have described the earliest stage of tooth decay as "chalky white spots", and an iconic toothpaste advertisement featuring school teacher "Mrs Marsh" used a chalk metaphor in this context.

Causes of developmental types of chalky teeth

Developmental types of chalky teeth (i.e. those due to abnormal tooth development inside the jaw) are thought to reflect one or more pathological disturbances, raising the prospect for medical prevention. For example, enamel hypomineralisation is attributed to local trauma or various medical conditions (e.g. fever, respiratory disease, vitamin D deficiency, adverse drug reaction), and dental fluorosis results from excessive consumption of fluoride during enamel development. Usually only one or several teeth are chalky in these instances where the primary cause isn't genetic – such acquired disorders are often accessible to prevention. Conversely, amelogenesis imperfecta is a relatively rare genetic disorder that distinctively may cause all teeth to be chalky.

Global health concerns about chalky teeth

Links between chalky teeth and accelerated tooth decay have long been recognised at academic and societal levels but largely overlooked by public health, dentistry, maternal and child health policy makers.  Evidence that the commonest type of chalky teeth (termed "chalky molars" or molar hypomineralisation) affects 1-in-5 children worldwide makes this association particularly concerning. In 2007, a translational research and education network (The D3 Group for developmental dental defects) was formed to advocate for and facilitate research into the management and prevention of chalky teeth. The D3 Group recognised that medico-dental research outcomes could lead to substantial reductions in childhood tooth decay and allied socioeconomic burdens. In 2013, they launched a public-awareness initiative (The Chalky Teeth Campaign) and an online education resource, aiming to increase understanding of this issue across society. Educational materials for non-specialist audiences, including a children's storybook about chalky molars, were central to this initiative. Subsequent activities involving public, professional and academic audiences have promoted "the fight against chalky teeth" as an attractive opportunity for jointly improving oral and paediatric health worldwide.  "Chalky teeth" is thereby growing from a nebulous colloquialism into a social-good mission and translational nomenclature that's being incorporated into other languages.

References

External links 
 What are Chalky Teeth? A comprehensive review about Chalky Teeth with numerous references to the academic literature.
 The Chalky Teeth Campaign. A public-awareness initiative of The D3 Group, that seeks to educate about chalky teeth problems and the urgent need for research.
The D3 Group for developmental dental defects. A scientifically-led international network group focussed on better care and understanding of people with chalky teeth.

Dentistry